Mehreen ( Persian: مهرین), also transliterated as Mehreen, is a feminine Persian name, meaning "sun-like" or "lovable". "Mehr" means "sun" or "affection/love" in Persian language. It is a popular name in Iran (Persia) and other Persian-speaking countries such as Afghanistan and Tajikistan. The Persian name is also popular among Arab countries.

Notable people with the name include:
 Mehreen Raheel, Pakistani actor
 Mehreen Mahmud, Bangladeshi singer
 Mehreen Faruqi, Australian politician
 Mehreen Anwar Raja, Pakistani politician
 Mehreen Jabbar, Pakistani film maker

See also
 for articles on persons with this first name

Persian feminine given names